Coffy is a 1973 American blaxploitation film.

Coffy may also refer to:

 Coffy (person) (died 1763), West African who led a slave revolt in the Dutch colony of Berbice (present-day Guyana)
 Robert-Joseph Coffy (1920–1995), French Roman Catholic cardinal and Archbishop of Marseille
 Lake Coffy, in the canton of Vaud, Switzerland
 Coffy (soundtrack), soundtrack for the film